Idaea micra is a moth of the family Geometridae first described by George Hampson in 1893. It is found in Asia, including Sri Lanka.

References

Geometridae
Moths of Asia
Moths described in 1893